Boom Crash Opera is the first album by Australian rock band Boom Crash Opera, released in 1987. Singles released from the album include two which reached the top 20 on the Australian Kent Music Report Singles Chart, "Great Wall" and "Hands Up in the Air".

In 1986 Boom Crash Opera signed with Dirty Pool Management and WEA Records. The band recorded their first two singles in 1986 with English producer Steve Brown (ABC, The Cult and Wham!) at Platinum Studios in Melbourne. Their debut single, "Great Wall", which was released in May 1986 reached No. 5 on the (Australian) national chart. Their second single, "Hands up in the Air", followed in late July, peaking at No. 16. Following which the band toured nationally with Icehouse.

At the ARIA Music Awards of 1987 the group were nominated for three awards: Highest Selling Single for "Great Wall", Best New Talent for both singles, and Best Video for "Hands up in the Air". At the Countdown Music and Video Awards of 1986, held in July 1987, "Great Wall" won Best Debut Single.

The label then flew the band to London to record their debut album at RAK Studios with producer, Alex Sadkin (Simply Red, Grace Jones, Talking Heads) and engineer, Will Gosling (Big Country). Both "Great Wall" and "Hands up in the Air" were remixed for their album versions. After recording the album Sadkin travelled to the Bahamas to work, where he died in a car accident in July. The self-titled album was released in September 1987, reached No. 19 on the Kent Music Report Albums Chart and went on to achieve Gold record status.  It spawned a further three singles, "City Flat" (June 1987), "Her Charity" (September 1987) and "Love Me to Death" (March 1988).

In an interview Farnan said "The whole idea of the album was to capture a live band feel, rather than a meticulously layered, constructed studio artist sound. We just wanted to capture a fairly live feel and wanted people feeling there were musicians playing and performing, rather than, you know, machines."

Track listing

Personnel 
 Peter Maslen – drums, vocals
 Greg O'Connor – keyboards
 Dale Ryder – lead vocals
 Richard Pleasance – guitar, bass, vocals
 Peter Farnan – guitar, vocals

Additional musicians 
 Frank Riccotti – percussion

Production 
 Art Direction – Jeri Heiden
 Engineer – Chris Corr
 Cover Design – Greg O'Connor
 Mastering – Ted Jensen
 Photography – Carrie Branovan
 Producer, Mixing – Alex Sadkin (tracks: "Gap That Opened", "Love Me to Death", "City Flat", "Her Charity", "Sleeping Time", "Bombshell", "Caught Between Two Towns", "Too Hot to Think")
 Producer – Steve Brown (tracks: "Hands up in the Air", "Great Wall")
 Associate Producer – Richard Pleasance (tracks: "Gap That Opened", "Love Me to Death", "City Flat", "Her Charity", "Sleeping Time", "Bombshell", "Caught Between Two Towns", "Too Hot to Think")
 Associate Producer – Peter Farnan (tracks: "Gap That Opened", "Love Me to Death", "City Flat", "Her Charity", "Sleeping Time", "Bombshell", "Caught Between Two Towns", "Too Hot to Think")
 Recording – Roy Spong (tracks: "Gap That Opened", "Love Me to Death", "City Flat", "Her Charity", "Sleeping Time", "Bombshell", "Caught Between Two Towns", "Too Hot to Think")
 Recording, Mixing – Will Gosling (tracks: "Gap That Opened", "Love Me to Death", "City Flat", "Her Charity", "Sleeping Time", "Bombshell", "Caught Between Two Towns", "Too Hot to Think")

Charts

Certifications

Release history

References

External links 
 Boom Crash Opera at Allmusic.com

1987 debut albums
Boom Crash Opera albums
Albums produced by Alex Sadkin